Jargalsaikhany Chuluunbat (born 3 December 1984, in Bayankhongor Province) is a Mongolian freestyle wrestler. He competed in the freestyle 120 kg event at the 2012 Summer Olympics and in the freestyle 125 kg event at the 2016 Summer Olympics; he defeated Malal Ndiaye in the 1/8 finals and was eliminated by Bilyal Makhov in the quarterfinals.

References

External links
 
 

1984 births
Living people
Mongolian male sport wrestlers
Olympic wrestlers of Mongolia
Wrestlers at the 2012 Summer Olympics
Wrestlers at the 2016 Summer Olympics
Asian Games medalists in wrestling
Asian Games silver medalists for Mongolia
Wrestlers at the 2006 Asian Games
Wrestlers at the 2010 Asian Games
Wrestlers at the 2014 Asian Games
Medalists at the 2010 Asian Games
People from Bayankhongor Province
Asian Wrestling Championships medalists
21st-century Mongolian people